Seneca is an unincorporated community in Union County, New Mexico, United States. Originally known as Cienaga, the name was corrupted by Anglophone settlers after the Civil War. The first postmaster was Flora Blackwell.

References

Unincorporated communities in Union County, New Mexico
Unincorporated communities in New Mexico